After God's Own Heart is a contemporary Christian music album by Steve Camp and was released by Sparrow Records in 1987. This album is best known for featuring his version of the song "Revive Us, O Lord", which he co-wrote with Carman (who recorded the song on his 1985 album, The Champion)

Track listing 
 "Come to the Lord" (Steve Camp, John Rosasco) - 3:24
 "The Church is All of You" (Camp, Rosasco) - 5:30
 "Whatever You Ask" (Phil McHugh, Michele Wagner) - 4:08
 "Who Knows" (Camp, Rosasco) - 4:14
 "When I Survey the Wondrous Cross" (Isaac Watts; Additional lyrics: Camp, Rosasco) - 5:30
 "Nothing to Prove" (Camp, John Fischer) - 4:40
 "After God's Own Heart" (Camp, Rosasco, Rob Frazier) - 5:18
 "If it Wasn't for the Grace of God" (Camp, Rosasco, Margaret Becker) - 4:41
 "Hopeless Sinners, Helpless Saints (Camp, Rosasco) - 5:12
 "Revive Us, O Lord" (Camp, Carman Licciardello) - 5:15
 "Till These Earthly Days Shall End" (Camp) - 4:03

Personnel 

 Steve Camp – lead and backing vocals, synthesizer programming, E-mu SP-12 programming
 Alan Pasqua – keyboards, synthesizer programming, acoustic piano solo (4)
 Smitty Price – keyboards, synthesizer programming
 John Rosasco – keyboards, Hammond B3 organ, B3 organ solo (3), acoustic piano solo (5), orchestration, brass section conductor
 Dann Huff – guitars, guitar solo (3)
 Leland Sklar – bass (1-9, 11)
 Joe Chemay – bass (10)
 John Robinson – drums, percussion, drum programming
 Alan Palmer – alto saxophone, tenor sax solo (2)
 Mark Watters – baritone saxophone, string conductor, chamber group conductor 
 Jon Clarke – tenor saxophone, oboe, English horn
 Brandon Fields – tenor sax solo (3)
 Charles Morillas – trombone 
 Daniel Fernero – trumpet
 John Fumo – trumpet
 Calvin Smith – French horn
 Amy Shulman – harp
 Margaret Becker – backing vocals
 Bob Bennett – backing vocals
 Bob Carlisle – backing vocals
 Pete Carlson – backing vocals
 Tamara Champlin – backing vocals
 Bridgett Evans – backing vocals
 Tommy Funderburk – backing vocals
 Steve Lively – backing vocals
 Kim Maxfield – backing vocals
 Michele Pillar – backing vocals
 Mark Williamson – backing vocals

Production

 Steve Camp – producer, arrangements
 John Rosasco – producer, arrangements
 Tammy Allcock – production coordinator
 Terry Christian – engineer
 David Schober – engineer
 Gabe Veltri – engineer
 Koji Egawa – assistant engineer
 Wade Jaynes – assistant engineer
 Larry Mah – assistant engineer
 Joe Schiff – assistant engineer
 Bart Stevens – assistant engineer
 Bill Schnee – mixing
 Mike Reese – mastering at The Mastering Lab, Hollywood, California
 Ocean Way Recording, Los Angeles, California – recording location
 Mad Hatter Studios, Los Angeles, California – recording location
 Bill Schnee Studios, Los Angeles, California – recording location, mixing location
 Bill Francis – music preparation 
 Barbara Catanzaro-Hearn – art direction 
 5 Penguins Design – design 
 Steven Heller – photography

References 

1987 albums
Steve Camp albums